Saglek Airport, formerly , is located in the Torngat Mountains in northern Labrador and was originally built by the United States Air Force (USAF) in 1954, as part of the Pinetree Line and formed part of RCAF Station Saglek.

In 1986, the Department of National Defence built an automated, long range radar site that forms part of the current North Warning System.

In addition to providing access to the automated radar site, this airstrip now serves as an access point for a research station located in the Torngat Mountains.

See also
Distant Early Warning Line

References

External links
Saglek, Labrador

Defunct airports in Newfoundland and Labrador
Military installations in Newfoundland and Labrador